He Leadeth Me is a gospel album by American gospel/soul singer Cissy Houston, released in 1997 on A & M Records. All the tracks were written and arranged by Houston. The album was produced, mastered and mixed by Joel Moss.

The album earned Houston a Grammy Award in 1999 for Best Traditional Gospel Album for a second time following her previous win for the same category in 1997.

Track listing

Personnel
Arranged By – Jimmy Vivino, Ouida Harding 
Arranged By, Producer, Vocals – Cissy Houston
Engineer, Mixed, Mastered, Producer – Joel Moss
Choir – Kevin Alford, Ingrid Arthur, Anita Jackson, 
Trombone - Richie Rosenberg
Jerry Vivino - Saxophone [Alto]
Strings - Julien Barber, Elena Barere, Lamar Alsop, David Heiss, Jean Ingraham, Paul Peabody, Dan Mullen, Laura Seaton, Sue Pray, Pam Zimmerman, Marty Sweet, Lisa Steinberg
Synthesizer - Bette Sussman
Drums – Steve Jordan
Jimmy Vivino - Guitar [Electric]
Bass – T. M. Stevens 
Trumpet, Horn - Earl Gardner
Patience Higgins - Saxophone [Baritone]
Darmon Meader - Saxophone [Tenor]
Edited By, Mastered By – Bernie Grundman 
Engineer – Paul J. Falcone, Mark Johnson
Engineer [Assistant] - Ted Wolhsen
Organ – Rudy Copeland
Organ [Hammond] - Leon Pendarvis
Percussion – Steve Forman
Piano, Organ – Ouida Harding

References

External links
Cissy Houston music
Cissy Houston Bio

1997 albums
Cissy Houston albums
A&M Records albums